Daniel Soper is a rugby union coach from New Zealand who has been assistant coach at Ulster since 2021.

Born in Alexandra, he played for Otago Sharks, setting a club scoring record of 260 points in 1997, and represented North Otago in the National Provincial Championship. He first came to Northern Ireland in 1998 to play for Banbridge RFC, and had a season in Italy, playing for Petrarca Padova in the 1999–2000 Heineken Cup. Returning to Northern Ireland, he played and coached at Ballynahinch RFC and Banbridge RFC while working as a schoolteacher at Wallace High School, Lisburn, Sullivan Upper School, Ballyclare High School, and Royal Belfast Academical Institution.

In club rugby, he coached Ballynahinch to the "grand slam" of the Ulster Senior Cup, the All-Ireland Cup and the Ulster Senior League in 2009. He became head coach of Banbridge in 2010, and led them to two promotions in the All Ireland League. In schools rugby, he coached future Irish international Darren Cave at Sullivan Upper, and led the RBAI rugby team, featuring future internationals James Hume and Michael Lowry, to three consecutive Ulster Schools' Cup titles between 2015 and 2017. He also coached the Ulster under-18 schools team. He joined Ulster as skills coach ahead of the 2018–19 season, and was promoted to assistant coach, in place of the departing Dwayne Peel, before the 2021–22 season.

References 

New Zealand rugby union coaches
New Zealand rugby union players
North Otago rugby union players
Petrarca Rugby players
Ballynahinch RFC players
Ulster Rugby non-playing staff
Living people
1977 births
New Zealand expatriate sportspeople in Northern Ireland
Expatriate rugby union players in Northern Ireland
New Zealand expatriate rugby union players
Expatriate rugby union players in Italy
New Zealand expatriate sportspeople in Italy
Rugby union players from Alexandra, New Zealand